Yapen (also Japan, Jobi) is an island of Papua, Indonesia. The Yapen Strait separates Yapen and the Biak Islands to the north. It is in Cenderawasih Bay off the north-western coast of the island of New Guinea. To the west is Mios Num Island across the Mios Num Strait, and to the east Kurudu Island. Off the southeast coast of Yapen are the Amboi Islands and to the southwest are the Kuran Islands. Together these islands form the Yapen Islands Regency within the province of Papua. It is populated with communities of Yobi, Randowaya, Serui, and Ansus.

First recorded sighting by Europeans is by Spanish navigator Álvaro de Saavedra who landed on 24 June 1528 when trying to return from Tidore to New Spain. It was then charted as Paine within the Islas de Oro (Golden Islands in Spanish), as they called Yapen and the present day Schoutens. In 1545 it was visited by Íñigo Órtiz de Retes on board of galleon San Juan.

The earthquake of 1979 caused serious damage and killed at least 115 people on the island.

Ecology

The island has been designated the Yapen rain forests ecoregion by the World Wildlife Federation for its unique bird life and flora. Two protected areas cover a third of the island, whose population is growing with subsequent clearance of forest for planting and firewood.

See also

Yapen languages

References

 01
Islands of Western New Guinea
Cenderawasih Bay
Landforms of Papua (province)
Islands of Oceania